Townsend House, Farm, or Farmhouse may refer to:

Australia 
 CanDo4Kids, previously known as Townsend House, a South Australian charity founded in 1874

United States 
(by state)
Townsend Farmhouse, Hollywood, Alabama, listed on the NRHP in Alabama
Thomas B. Townsend House, Montrose, Colorado, listed on the NRHP in Colorado
Townsend House (Washington, D.C.), built for Richard H. Townsend, now the Cosmos Club
James W. Townsend House (Lake Butler, Florida), listed on the NRHP in Florida
James W. Townsend House (Orange Springs, Florida), listed on the NRHP in Florida
Townsend Home, Stockton, Illinois, listed on the NRHP in Illinois
Townsend House (Ruston, Louisiana), listed on the NRHP in Louisiana
Townsend House & Pullen Museum, Catonsville, Maryland
Townsend House (Needham, Massachusetts), listed on the NRHP in Massachusetts
Townsend House (Wellfleet, Massachusetts), listed on the NRHP in Massachusetts
George Townsend House, Tecumseh, Nebraska, listed on the NRHP in Nebraska
Jabez Townsend House, Harrisville, New Hampshire, listed on the NRHP in New Hampshire
Townsend Farm, Dublin, New Hampshire, listed on the NRHP in New Hampshire
William S. Townsend House, Dennisville, New Jersey, listed on the NRHP in New Jersey
Henry Townsend House, Huntington, New York, listed on the NRHP in New York
Townsend House, renamed Raynham Hall in 1850, Oyster Bay, New York, listed on the NRHP in New York
William T. Townsend House, Sandusky, Ohio, listed on the NRHP in Ohio
Townsend House (Pughtown, Pennsylvania), listed on the NRHP in Pennsylvania
Townsend-Wilkins House, Victoria, Texas, listed on the NRHP in Texas
Townsend North House, Vassar, Michigan, listed on the NRHP in Michigan

See also
James W. Townsend House (disambiguation)